52 Heroor is a village in the southern state of Karnataka, India. It is located in the Udupi taluk of Udupi district in Karnataka.

This village has factories like Supreme feeds, Krishna Dairy and Hangyo Ice Cream.

See also
 Udupi
 Districts of Karnataka

References

External links
 http://Udupi.nic.in/

Villages in Udupi district